Smeeth Road was a railway station serving the villages of Emneth Hungate, Marshland St James and St John Fen's End, all east of Wisbech in Norfolk, England. The station was opened in 1848 as an extension of the East Anglian Railway's line from Magdalen Road station (now known as Watlington) to Wisbech East. The station's location, like that of the neighbouring Middle Drove station, was fairly rural and the line eventually closed in 1968,  Smeeth Road's station building survived closure, and has since been converted into a private residence.

The old 'Signal Box' which sat adjacent to the station remained intact until it was dismantled in 2005 and replaced with a 3 bedroom 'Eco' home. The new Signal Box retains some original features and designs of the old one with a traditional/modern look. The old platform to the station which is largely intact marks the boundary line between both the station and the signal box.

The old goods shed which sat behind the station was converted into 6 flats (St James Court). This also retains some of the original features including part of the original platform.

References

Disused railway stations in Norfolk
Former Great Eastern Railway stations
Railway stations in Great Britain opened in 1848
Railway stations in Great Britain closed in 1968
King's Lynn and West Norfolk